Notaden is a genus of burrowing ground frogs native to central and northern Australia. Their common name is Australian spadefoot toads.

Description 
Its body is very round in shape with a short neck.  Its pupils are horizontal slits.  It has long arms and short, stubby legs.  Its fingers lack webbing and its toes may have slight to no webbing.  The skin is slightly warty and very glandular.  Because of its similarity to some species of toads it is often incorrectly referred to as a toad.  It excretes poisonous sticky fluid from its skin when handled.  It lays eggs in chains similar to some toad species.

Species
There are four species in this genus:

References

External links 

 
Amphibians of Australia
Amphibian genera
Taxa named by Albert Günther